The Duel may refer to:

Literature
The Duel (poem), a poem by Eugene Field
The Duel (Chekhov novel), an 1891 novella by Anton Chekhov
The Duel (Kuprin novel), a 1905 novel by Aleksandr Kuprin
The Duel (Conrad story), 1908 short story by Joseph Conrad
"The Duel" (Borges story), a 1970 short story by Jorge Luis Borges
The Duel: Pakistan on the Flight Path of American Power, a 2008 book by Tariq Ali

Film and television
The Duel (1910 film)
The Duel (1927 film)
The Duel (1939 film)
The Duel (1971 film), a 1971 Hong Kong film
The Duel (2000 film), a 2000 Chinese Lunar New Year's wuxia film directed by Andrew Lau
The Duel (2010 film)
The Duel (2016 film)
"The Duel" (How I Met Your Mother), a 2005 episode of How I Met Your Mother
"The Duel" (The Office), a 2009 episode of The Office
Real World/Road Rules Challenge: The Duel, the 2006–2007 season of the MTV reality television program Real World/Road Rules Challenge
"The Duel", a composition by Giorgio Moroder for the film Electric Dreams

Other
The Duel: Test Drive II, a cross-platform racing game
The Duel (Dexter Gordon album)
The Duel (Allison Moorer album)

See also
Duel (disambiguation)